The Zilog Z80182 is an enhanced, faster version of the older Z80 and is part of the Z180 microprocessor family. It's nicknamed the Zilog Intelligent Peripheral Controller (ZIP).

It has the following features:

 Two ESCC (enhanced serial channel controller) channels with 32-bit CRC 
 Two UART (serial controller interface) channels
 Internal configurable address decoder
 Three PIA (Programmable I/O adapter) ports
 Two 16-bit timers
 One CSIO (Clocked Serial Input/output) channel
 One MMU (Memory management Unit) that expands the addressing range to 20 bits
 Wait state generator
 Two DMA channels
 Interrupt controller
 Extended instructions
 16550 MIMIC interface
 Crystal oscillator

It's also fully static (the clock can be halted and no data in the registers will be lost) and has a low EMI option that reduces the slew rate of the outputs.

The Z80182 can operate at 33 MHz with an external oscillator for 5 volt operation or 20 MHz using the internal oscillator for 3.3 volt operation.

Notes

References 
 
 
 

Zilog microprocessors